Vicente "El Loco" Rodríguez Valera (born September 11, 1891) in Havana, Cuba was a baseball catcher in the pre-Negro leagues, Negro leagues and Cuban League from 1912 to 1923.

Rodriguez also pitched at least three games for the Cuban Stars (West), once in 1913 and twice in 1918, finishing with a 2-1 record.

References

External links
 and Baseball-Reference Black Baseball stats and Seamheads

1891 births
Year of death missing
Baseball catchers
Almendares (baseball) players
Bacharach Giants players
Club Fé players
Cuban Stars (East) players
Cuban Stars (West) players
Detroit Stars players
Marianao players
San Francisco Park players
Kansas City Monarchs players
Baseball players from Havana
Cuban expatriate baseball players in the United States